Events from the year 1701 in art.

Events
 November – Philippe Bertrand becomes a member of the Académie de peinture et de sculpture.
 December 31 – Pierre Gobert becomes a member of the Académie de peinture et de sculpture.
 13-year-old François Lemoyne becomes a member of the Académie de peinture et de sculpture.
 Peter Strudel becomes Reichsfreiherr and is appointed the director of the landscape academy in Vienna.
 A sculptured life-size series on the Danse Macabre theme is moved to the old Neustädter Kirchhoff following a fire at the palace of Duke George in Dresden.

Paintings
 Giuseppe Maria Crespi – The Ecstasy of Saint Margaret
 Sir Godfrey Kneller – William III on Horseback
 Sebastiano Ricci – Ascension (Santi Apostoli, Rome)
 Hyacinthe Rigaud – Portrait of Louis XIV of the House of Bourbon, the Sun King

Publications
 Gerard de Lairesse – Grondlegginge der teekenkonst

Births
 April 28 – Françoise Basseporte, French court painter (died 1780)
 May 29 – Georg Friedrich Strass, Alsatian jeweler and inventor of imitation gemstones and the rhinestone (died 1773)
 June 4 – Theodoor Verhaegen, sculptor from the Southern Netherlands (died 1759)
 November 5 – Pietro Longhi, Venetian painter (died 1785)
 December 16 – Olof Arenius, Swedish portrait painter (died 1766)
 December 21 – Guillaume Taraval, Swedish painter of French descent (died 1750)
 date unknown
 Jan George Freezen, German portrait painter (died 1775)
 Thomas Hudson, English portrait painter (died 1779)
 Matthew Pilkington, Irish art historian and satirist (died 1774)
 José Romeo, Spanish painter of the Baroque period (died 1722)

Deaths
 January 1 – Henri Gascar, French painter (born 1635)
 March 28 – Domenico Guidi, sculptor (born 1625)
 May 8 – Jacob de Heusch, painter (born 1656)
 June 29 – Pieter Mulier II, Dutch Golden Age painter (born 1637)
 July 16 – Justus Danckerts, Dutch engraver (born 1635)
 July 24 – John Bushnell, English sculptor (date of birth unknown)
 date unknown – Jacob Gillig, Dutch Golden Age painter of still lifes, usually of fish, as well as portraits (born 1636)

 
Years of the 18th century in art
1700s in art